Gnathophis smithi is an eel in the family Congridae (conger/garden eels). It was described by Emma Stanislavovna Karmovskaya in 1990. It is a subtropical, marine eel which is known from the Nazca and Sala y Gómez ridges, in the southeastern Pacific Ocean. It dwells at a depth range of 145–250 metres, and leads a nocturnal lifestyle. Males can reach a maximum total length of 41.1 centimetres. The eel's diet includes benthic crustaceans and polychaetes.

The species epithet refers to David G. Smith, noted for specializing in the study of eels.

References

smithi
Fish described in 1990